Great Britain competed at the 2016 European Athletics Championships in Amsterdam, Netherlands, from 6–10 July 2016. British Athletics named a team of 98 athletes on 27 June 2016. On 4 July 2016 British Athletics confirmed that Adam Gemili would stand down from the 100m, and concentrate on the relay; his place was taken by reserve Ojie Edoburun. William Sharman also withdrew, his place taken by David King.

Medals

Results

Men

Track & road events

Field Events

Combined events – Decathlon

Women

Track & road events

Field Events

Combined events – Heptathlon

Key
Q = Qualified for the next round
q = Qualified for the next round as a fastest loser or, in field events, by position without achieving the qualifying target
N/A = Round not applicable for the event
Bye = Athlete not required to compete in round

References

Nations at the 2016 European Athletics Championships
Great Britain at the European Athletics Championships
European Athletics Championships